Upson House may refer to:

in the United States (by state)
Hubbard-Upson House, Sacramento, California, listed on the National Register of Historic Places in Sacramento County, California
Upson House (Athens, Georgia), listed on the National Register of Historic Places in Clarke County, Georgia
Pearl Upson House, Reno, Nevada, listed on the National Register of Historic Places in Washoe County, Nevada
Upson House (Mansfield, Ohio), listed on the National Register of Historic Places in Richland County, Ohio